"This Heart of Mine" is a 1944 song.  This music standard was written by composer Harry Warren and lyricist Arthur Freed to be featured in the musical film score Ziegfeld Follies.  This song is introduced by Fred Astaire who danced with Lucille Bremer in a lavish and romantic dance. In the same film, Esther Williams swam in a water ballet to a softer, instrumental version of the song.

The dance sequence 

Astaire plays a con artist hoping to steal some jewelry.  He dances with a larger lady but soon he eyes the beautiful Lucille Bremer and cuts in to dance with her.  They proceed to dance out in the terrace where they dance around steps and moving walkways.  It ends with the end of the ball and Astaire stealing Lucille's bracelet while kissing her.  She then proceeds to give him her necklace. They separate and Astaire ponders if he'd allowed his chance for real love get away.  He looks back and she runs into his arms.

This was the second of four features for Fred Astaire in the movie Ziegfeld Follies.

Other recordings
 1944 Fred Astaire - a single release recorded for Decca Records on December 13, 1944 (catalog No. 23388).
 1945 Maxine Sullivan - recorded on January 15, 1945 with the Teddy Wilson Quintet for Musicraft records. (catalog No. 317).
 1945 Judy Garland - recorded on January 26, 1945 for Decca Records (catalog No. 18660A). This briefly reached No. 22 in the Billboard charts. 
 1956 Steve Lawrence - About "That" Girl.
 1958 Johnny Mathis - for his album Swing Softly.
 1960 Dinah Washington - September in the Rain.
 1964 Sarah Vaughan - Vaughan with Voices.

References

External links 
lyrics

Fred Astaire songs
Songs with music by Harry Warren
Songs with lyrics by Arthur Freed
1946 songs